Wielogóra may refer to the following places in Poland:
Wielogóra, Świętokrzyskie Voivodeship (south-central Poland)
Wielogóra, Masovian Voivodeship (east-central Poland)